The  Jacksonville Sharks season was the fourth season for the franchise in the Arena Football League. The team was coached by Les Moss and played their home games at Jacksonville Veterans Memorial Arena. After winning the South Division for the fourth consecutive year, the Sharks were eliminated in the conference championship game by the Philadelphia Soul for the second straight year.

Final roster

Standings

Schedule

Regular season
The Sharks began the season on the road against the Tampa Bay Storm on March 24. Their first home game was on April 12 against the New Orleans VooDoo. They closed the regular season against the Storm at home on July 27.

Playoffs

References

Jacksonville Sharks
Jacksonville Sharks seasons
Jack